The 1954–55 La Liga was the 24th season since its establishment. Real Madrid were the defending champions and successfully retained the title.

Teams

Stadia and locations

League table

Results

Relegation group

Standings

Results

Top scorers

External links
 Official LFP Site

1954 1955
1954–55 in Spanish football leagues
Spain